Mount Zion United Methodist Church may refer to:

 Mount Zion United Methodist Church (Washington, D.C.), listed on the U.S. National Register of Historic Places
 Mount Zion United Methodist Church (Ellicott City, Maryland)
 Mount Zion United Methodist Church (Crabtree, North Carolina), NRHP-listed
 Mount Zion United Methodist Church (Belton, Texas), NRHP-listed